The climate of South Africa is determined by South Africa's situation between 22°S and 35°S, in the Southern Hemisphere's subtropical zone, and its location between two oceans, Atlantic and the Indian.

It has a smaller variety of climates than most other countries in sub-Saharan Africa, and it has lower average temperatures than other countries within this range of latitude, like Australia, because much of the interior (central plateau or Highveld, including Johannesburg) of South Africa is at a higher elevation.

Winter temperatures may reach the freezing point at high altitude, but are at their most mild in coastal regions, particularly KwaZulu Natal Province and perhaps the Eastern Cape. Cold and warm coastal currents running north-west and north-east respectively account for the difference in climates between west and east coasts. The weather is also influenced by the El Niño–Southern Oscillation.

South Africa experiences a high degree of sunshine with rainfall about half of the global average, increasing from west to east, and with semi-desert regions in the north-west. While the Western Cape has a Mediterranean climate with winter rainfall, most of the country experiences summer rain.

Temperature 
South Africa has typical weather for the Southern Hemisphere, with the coldest days in June–August. In winter temperatures can drop below freezing, also due to altitude. During winter it is warmest in the coastal regions, especially on the eastern Indian Ocean coast.

Warm season weather is influenced by the El Niño–Southern Oscillation (ENSO). South Africa experiences hotter and drier weather during the El Niño phase, while La Niña brings cooler and wetter conditions.

Precipitation 
South Africa is a sunny country, averaging 8–10 daily sunshine hours in most regions. The average annual rainfall for South Africa is about 464 mm (compared to a global average of 786 mm) but large and unpredictable variations are common. Overall, rainfall is greatest in the east and gradually decreases westward, with some semi-desert areas along the western edge of South Africa. For most of the country, rain falls mainly in the summer months with brief afternoon thunderstorms. The exception is the Western Cape and its capital city Cape Town where the climate is Mediterranean and it rains more in the wintertime. In the winter months, snow collects on the high mountains of the Cape and the Drakensberg.

Oceans 
South Africa's coasts are major tourist attractions and trade locations. This makes the ocean important to South Africa and its citizens. The Indian and Atlantic oceans meet at the southwestern tip of South Africa. The warm Agulhas Current runs south along the east coast and the cold Benguela Current flows north along the western shore. As a result, there is at least a 6 °C difference in the annual temperatures of Durban (on the east) and Port Nolloth (on the west) despite being located at roughly the same latitude.
With several other parts on the interior not receiving an adequate amount of rainfall and thus prone to droughts.

Climatic zones 

Climatic zones are often referred to by the seasonal pattern of rainfall. The winter rainfall region is confined to a relatively small area in the south-west, the Western Cape area, where gentle rain falls from May to August but the summers are dry. The summer rainfall region is the largest, being most of the country north of the coastal areas and the north west arid desert. Rain falls from October to February and is often heavy, with the amount of precipitation increasing from west to east. The summer and winter rainfall region is the Eastern Cape. The arid regions are in the north-west, with the driest areas being the north-west coast. Vegetation tends to vary by climatic zone and these also correspond to the horticultural zones.

The Highveld is the eastern plateau area of South Africa. The former central business district is found on the south side of the prominent ridge called the Witwatersrand and the terrain falls to the north and south. By and large the Witwatersrand marks the watershed between the Limpopo and Vaal Rivers. The north and west of the city has undulating hills while the eastern parts are flatter.

Johannesburg enjoys a dry, sunny climate, with the exception of occasional late afternoon downpours in the summer months of October to April. Winter is the sunniest time of the year, with cool days and cold nights. The temperature occasionally drops to below freezing at night, causing frost. Regular cold fronts pass over in winter bringing very cold southerly winds but usually clear skies. Infrequent showers occur through the course of the winter months.

The Western Cape province has a Mediterranean climate with warm to hot, dry, sunny summer weather and mild, rainy conditions in winter.

Climate change

See also
Effects of global warming
Cape Town water crisis
2018–19 Southern Africa drought
Main features of climate

References

Sources 

 
 
 
 

  
South Africa
Environment of South Africa